Otto Maria Krämer (born 1964) is a German organist and church musician.

Krämer studied at the Folkwang Hochschule, Essen and at the Robert Schumann Hochschule Düsseldorf. His teacher was Wolfgang Seifen. In 1994 he passed his examination (A). Since 1993 he has worked as cantor and organist in Straelen. In 1995 he won the first prize of the Concours d'Improvisation a l'orgue  Montbrison. He was teacher for improvisation at the Westminster Choir College in Princeton, New Jersey.

Compositions
Fünf sinfonische Momente für Orgel
Prélude et Fugue dansée sur le nom Gaston
Messe brève
Subvenite
Exultate 
Missa Festiva

External links
Orgelimprovisationen

German classical organists
German male organists
Organ improvisers
1964 births
Living people
21st-century organists
21st-century German male musicians
Male classical organists